The Farlow Herbarium of Cryptogamic Botany is an herbarium and library at Harvard University with about 1,400,000 specimens, including approximately 75,000 types, of lichens, fungi, bryophytes, diatoms, and algae. It grew from the 1919 bequest of William Gilson Farlow of his personal herbarium and library to Harvard. It grew further from additional bequests from Roland Thaxter, and specimens, manuscripts, correspondence, illustrations, and field notes from other notable researchers such as E. B. Bartram, E. A. Burt, W. H. Weston Jr., D. H. Linder, and I. M. Lamb.

References

Herbaria in the United States
Harvard University
Research institutes in Massachusetts